Stone is a 2010 American crime thriller film directed by John Curran and starring Robert De Niro, Edward Norton and Milla Jovovich. Most of the filming was done in Washtenaw County, Michigan. It was the final film to be released by Overture Films. This is the second film which De Niro and Norton shared on the same screen together, after The Score (2001).

Plot

Young mother Madylyn Mabry puts her daughter to bed while her husband Jack watches golf on television. After the child is asleep, she goes downstairs and announces she's leaving him. He runs upstairs to the bedroom and holds their daughter out the window, threatening to drop her if Madylyn leaves.

Years later, Jack and Madylyn Mabry return home from church for a quiet afternoon. He watches TV and drinks in an identical pose. Late that night a call wakes them. Jack picks up the phone and hears a woman's voice. Jack reports to work at a prison, where he is a parole officer. He is called into the warden's office. His upcoming retirement is brought up. Jack requests that he keep all of his inmates until he leaves, in order to see them through until review.

Jack has a new case in his office, named Gerald Creeson. The inmate insists that he likes to be called Stone. Stone asks Jack if he can help him get out early. They attempt to talk about each other's wives. Jack explains that he does not want to discuss his wife, and that they are there to talk about his case. Stone later phones his wife, Lucetta, from prison.

Stone and Jack hold several more meetings. Stone tells him he deserves to be free. That night Lucetta leaves a message on Jack and Madylyn's answering machine. She shows up at the prison the next day to meet Jack. Lucetta phones Jack again and they meet for lunch. They end up at Lucetta's home. After a few drinks, he sleeps with Lucetta. At prison, two guards arrive to escort Stone to the infirmary. While waiting for someone to see him, he witnesses another inmate being brutally murdered.

Jack soon goes to see Lucetta several more times for sex. Jack tells her no-one can know about their relationship. One day, he tells Stone that he sent the report recommending early release. The next morning, Jack asks the warden for Stone's report. The warden informs him Stone's parole hearing is in an hour and no changes can be made. Jack does not stay for the hearing.

Stone is informed that he will be released. Stone tells Jack that he knows about the relationship between him and Lucetta. That night, Jack goes home with paranoia and is awoken by a fire in his home. Later, Madylyn, her daughter and her granddaughter look through photo albums. Jack is now retired trying to determine his future.

Cast
 Robert De Niro as Jack Mabry, a parole officer who is only weeks from retirement.
 Edward Norton as Gerald "Stone" Creeson, a convicted arsonist seeking parole by any means.
 Milla Jovovich as Lucetta, Stone's wife
 Frances Conroy as Madylyn, Jack's wife.

Enver Gjokaj and Pepper Binkley appear as younger versions of Jack and Madylyn Mabry, respectively. Many Ypsilanti residents appear as extras.

Production
The film was directed by John Curran, from a screenplay by Angus MacLachlan. Originally written by MacLachlan in 2000 as a play, it has been performed once, in 2003 as a staged reading. In 2005, MacLachlan turned it into a screenplay aiming for a 2010 release. The film was overseen by Mimran Schur Pictures, with the aid of producer Holly Wiersma. Stone is the debut of Mimran Schur Pictures, formed in 2010 by private investor David Mimran and long-time music business executive and former Geffen Records President Jordan Schur. Stone Productions, the film's production company, also aided in the production of the film.

Filming began on May 18, 2009, in Michigan. Prison scenes were filmed at the Southern Michigan Correctional Facility in Blackman Township. The Emmanuel Lutheran Church of Ypsilanti hosted filming for two days. The funeral service and a few outside scenes were filmed at the Church, with locals as extras. Mast Road, in Dexter, was closed for several weeks while the farmhouse scenes were shot at the historic Mast Farm house; and, at the end of the shoot, it was burned down.

Filming was interrupted on June 5, 2009, when an intoxicated woman got past security and accosted Robert De Niro. She was arrested and admitted to a local hospital.

Following a screening at the Toronto International Film Festival, Stone premiered in the United States at the Fantastic Fest in Austin, Texas on September 24, 2010.

The main theme for the film was composed by musician Jon Brion.

Reception
Stone has received generally mixed reviews. Review aggregate Rotten Tomatoes reports that 51% of critics have given the film a positive review based on 95 reviews, with an average score of 5.7/10. Metacritic gave the film an average score of 57/100 based 22 reviews.

Roger Ebert, in a positive review of the film, writes: "Stone has Robert De Niro and Edward Norton playing against type and at the top of their forms in a psychological duel between a parole officer and a tricky prisoner who has his number."

The film was a box office bomb; as of November 11, 2010, the film had grossed US$8,463,124, which is approximately one-third of its production budget.

Awards
Milla Jovovich received the Hollywood Spotlight Award for her work in Stone at the 14th Annual Hollywood Awards Gala at The Beverly Hilton in Beverly Hills.

References

External links
 
 
 
 

2010 films
2010s prison films
American drama films
Films directed by John Curran
Films shot in Michigan
Films shot in Detroit
2010 drama films
2010s English-language films
2010s American films